Per Larsen (born 27 June 1965 in Jerslev) is a Danish politician, who is a member of the Folketing for the Conservative People's Party. He was elected into parliament in the 2019 Danish general election.

Political career
Larsen sat in the county council of the North Jutland County from 1998 to 2001. He also sat in the municipal council of Hjørring Municipality from 2002 to 2009. He has been a member of the regional council of Region of North Jutland since 2006.

Larsen was elected into the Folketing in the 2019 election, where he received 1,625	votes.

References

External links 
 Biography on the website of the Danish Parliament (Folketinget)

Living people
1965 births
People from Brønderslev Municipality
Conservative People's Party (Denmark) politicians
Danish municipal councillors
20th-century Danish politicians
Members of the Folketing 2019–2022
Members of the Folketing 2022–2026